Scott Higginbotham (born 5 September 1986) is a retired Australian rugby union player. Capped 32 times for Australia's national team, the Wallabies, Higginbotham's usual positions are blindside flanker and number eight.

Higginbotham currently holds the record for highest try-scoring forward in Super Rugby history.

Early life
Higginbotham was educated at The Southport School, on the Gold Coast, Queensland. His mother was born in Fiji and is part-Fijian, which made him eligible to play internationally for Fiji, something which Higginbotham contemplated before being accepted into the Wallabies.

Career
In 2007–2008, Higginbotham played international rugby sevens for the Australian national rugby sevens team.

In 2007, Higginbotham was the Queensland Reds Academy Player of the Year, and made his Super 14 debut with the Reds the following year against the Bulls. Higginbotham was an integral member of the Reds team that won the Super Rugby championship in 2011.

In August 2010, Higginbotham was named as a reserve for Australia to play against South Africa in Pretoria. Higginbotham made his international test debut for the Wallabies against France on 27 November 2010 at the State de France.

In 2013, Higginbotham commenced a two-year contract for the Melbourne Rebels. Higginbotham was expected to bring size and versatility to the Rebels loose-forwards. Rebels coach Damien Hill said that "[In Higginbotham] you've got one of the best ball-running, lineout jumping options in Australian rugby." Hill praised Higginbotham for his "aggression and intent at contact". Throughout 2013, Higginbotham acted as fill-in captain for the injured Rebels' skipper Gareth Delve, and in 2014 Higginbotham was officially announced as the captain for the Rebels, a position he held for the remainder of his tenure with the club. In his final Super Rugby campaign at the Rebels, Higginbotham surpassed Owen Finegan as the leading try-scoring forward in Super Rugby history, and was awarded the 2015 Growden Medal Award for being the most consistent player among the Australian provinces.

In 2015, Higginbotham left the Melbourne Rebels after signing a two-year contract with the NEC Green Rockets, based in Abiko, Chiba, Japan.

Higginbotham signed a three-year contract in 2016 to return to the Queensland Reds for the 2017 Super Rugby season. On 1 February 2018 Scott Higginbotham was named captain of the Queensland-based side. On 1 June 2019 Scott Higginbotham made his 100th appearance for the Queensland based side.

On 17 February 2019, Higginbotham left Australia to join French side Bordeaux in the Top 14 competition ahead of the 2019–20 season.

Higginbotham retired in September 2021.

Super Rugby statistics

References

External links
 Melbourne Rebels profile

1986 births
Living people
Australia international rugby union players
Australian expatriate rugby union players
Australian expatriate sportspeople in Japan
Australian people of I-Taukei Fijian descent
Australian rugby union players
Brisbane City (rugby union) players
Expatriate rugby union players in France
Expatriate rugby union players in Japan
Green Rockets Tokatsu players
Melbourne Rebels players
People educated at the Southport School
Queensland Reds players
Rugby union flankers
Rugby union number eights
Rugby union players from Perth, Western Australia
Sportsmen from Western Australia
Union Bordeaux Bègles players
Australian expatriate sportspeople in France